Kuhpayeh Rural District is a rural district (dehestan) in Nowbaran District, Saveh County, Markazi Province, Iran. At the 2006 census, its population was 3,891, in 1,453 families. The rural district has 23 villages.

References 

Rural Districts of Markazi Province
Saveh County